A central government is the government that is a controlling power over a unitary state. Another distinct but sovereign political entity is a federal government, which may have distinct powers at various levels of government, authorized or delegated to it by the Federation and mutually agreed upon by each of the federated states. Though inappropriate, the adjective "central" is also sometimes used to describe the government of a federation, such as in India.  

The structure of central governments varies. Many countries have created autonomous regions by delegating powers from the central government to governments on a sub-national level, such as regional, state, provincial, local and other instances. Based on a broad definition of a basic political system, there are two or more levels of government that exist within an established territory and government through common institutions with overlapping or shared powers as prescribed by a constitution or other law.

Common responsibilities of this level of government which are not granted to lower levels are maintaining national security and exercising international diplomacy, including the right to sign binding treaties. Essentially, the central government has the power to make laws for the whole country, in contrast with local governments.

The difference between a central government and a federal government is that the autonomous status of self-governing regions exists by the sufferance of the central government and are often created through a process of devolution. As such they may be unilaterally revoked with a simple change in the law. An example of this was done in 1973 when the Northern Ireland Constitution Act 1973 abolished the government of Northern Ireland which had been created under the Government of Ireland Act 1920. It is common for a federal government to be brought into being by agreement between a number of formally independent states and therefore its powers to affect the status of the balance of powers is significantly smaller (as in the United States). Thus federal governments are often established voluntarily from 'below' whereas devolution grants self-government from above.

Examples

Unitary states 
There are, and have been, many countries which have delegated powers, some include:
  People's Republic of China – see autonomous administrative divisions of China
  Denmark – see the autonomous regions of the Faroe Islands and Greenland
  France
  Republic of China
  Georgia – see autonomous republics
  Japan
  Republic of Korea
  Indonesia
  Spain – see autonomous communities
  Philippines - see Provinces of the Philippines
  Portugal – see autonomous regions of Portugal
  Turkey
  Ukraine
  United Kingdom – devolved powers to governments of Scotland, Wales and Northern Ireland.
  Vietnam

Federations 
A federal government is the common or national government of a federation. The United States is considered the first modern federation. After declaring independence from Britain, the U.S. adopted its first constitution, the Articles of Confederation in 1781. This was the first step towards federalism by establishing the confederal Congress. However, Congress was limited as to its ability to pursue economic, military, and judiciary reform. In 1787, a Constitutional Convention drafted the United States Constitution during the Philadelphia Convention. After the ratification of the Constitution by nine states in 1788, the U.S. was officially a federation, putting the U.S. in a unique position where the central government exists by the sufferance of the individual states rather than the reverse. 

Other states followed suit in establishing federal governments: Switzerland (1848); Canada (1867); Germany (1871 and again 1949); Brazil (1891); Australia (1901); Russia (1917); Austria (1920 and again 1945) and India (1947 and again 1950). Examples include:

  Austria
  Argentina
  Australia – states and territories of Australia
  Belgium – see communities, regions and language areas of Belgium
  Brazil
  India - States and union territories of India
  Canada – see provinces and territories of Canada
  Germany – see states of Germany
  Malaysia
  Mexico – see states of Mexico
  Nigeria
  Nepal
  Pakistan – see administrative units of Pakistan
  Russia – see federal districts of Russia, federal subjects of Russia
  Soviet Union – see republics of the Soviet Union
  Sudan – see South Sudan, which is now independent
  Switzerland – cantons of Switzerland
  United States – see U.S. states
  Venezuela – see states of Venezuela

Confederations 
  United States Government under the Articles of Confederation
  Confederate States of America

See also 
 National Government (disambiguation)
 List of autonomous areas by country
 Autonomous government
Devolution of powers
 Federation

References 

Unitary state
Political geography
Federalism